Scurrilous is the third studio album by Canadian progressive metal band Protest the Hero. It was released on March 22, 2011. The word scurrilous is defined as "vulgar verbal abuse; foul-mouthed; coarse, vulgar, abusive, or slanderous."

It is the last album released under Protest the Hero's original lineup, due to the departure of drummer Moe Carlson and bassist Arif Mirabdolbaghi two years later.

Overview
Recording for Scurrilous began on August 30, 2010. Walker stated on his Twitter page on that day: "it has begun"  and also on his Facebook page on the 31st that "It is underway", both in reference to the band's next full-length album recording. During the recording process, Protest the Hero posted three studio updates showcasing bass, drums, guitar and vocals. The band has stated that the album will contain a more "progressive" sound compared to their last two albums.

In support of the album, Protest the Hero embarked on a North American tour, with a large number of dates in their native Canada, from March to May 2011.

The band released the first single "C'est La Vie" on February 3, 2011.

Cover art
The album cover is a picture of a 60-year-old painting by bassist Arif Mirabdolbaghi's grandfather, Jafar Petgar, titled "Scurrilous". The painting was inspired by a disagreement between Petgar and his wife that stemmed from "conjecture and scurrilous lies" being spread by a neighbor. The painting is meant to represent the world fleeing from the lies originating from the human tongue. According to Mirabdolbaghi, the piece was selected by Protest the Hero as the cover art for Scurrilous because they "thought the wide and varied use of color in the piece reflected the contrasting sonic landscapes of the music on the album."

Reception

Critical reception for Scurrilous has generally been positive, with the album receiving four out of five stars from Allmusic, who lauded the band for its shift toward more personal lyrics. Adam Thomas of Sputnikmusic found the album to be "a lot less jarring when compared to their past work, with the transitions between the light speed arpeggio runs, tight modern metal riffing, and mathy stop start sections seamlessly binding it all together." However, Decibel magazine gave the album a five out of ten.

Track listing
All music by Protest the Hero

Trivia
 C'est la vie is a French figure of speech that translates to "such is life," meaning that life is sometimes harsh, but one must accept it. The phrase coincides with the lyrical content of the song which discusses the futility of suicide.
 The track title "Dunsel" is a reference to Star Trek, which all members of the band are known to be avid fans of. The term is first used in the episode "The Ultimate Computer", where Spock explains that the term is used by midshipmen to describe a position or role that serves no real purpose. This too coincides with the lyrical content of the song.

Personnel

Protest the Hero
 Moe Carlson – drums
 Luke Hoskin – guitars
 Tim Millar – guitars, keys
 Arif Mirabdolbaghi – bass
 Rody Walker – vocals

Guest musicians
 Julius Butty – vocals
 Chris Hannah – vocals
 Porter Hoskin – vocals
 Jadea Kelly – vocals

Artwork and packaging
 Ben Goetting – design, layout
 Jafar Petgar – artwork

Production and recording
 Nick Blagona – engineering
 Marco Bressette – editing
 Julius "The Juice" Butty – engineering, production
 João Carvalho – mastering
 George Hadji-Christou – pre-production
 Jonny Harris – assistant engineering
 Andy Mack – guitar technician
 Darren "Jeter" Magierowski – assistant engineering
 Larry Mazer – management
 Cameron McLellan – pre-production
 Greg Pavlica – guitar technician
 Jeff Zurba – drum technician

References

External links
Scurrilous album stream at Myspace Music
Track-by-track from Rody Walker
Album Review

2011 albums
Protest the Hero albums
Vagrant Records albums
Albums recorded at Metalworks Studios